Persatuan Sepakbola Indonesia Rembang, commonly known as PSIR, is an Indonesian football team located in Rembang Regency, Central Java. They play in the Liga 3. Their home stadium is Krida Stadium. In the 2011/2012 season, PSIR Rembang was promoted to the highest caste of national football, Indonesia Premier League when competition dualism occurred. Then back to the second caste in 2014 Liga Indonesia Premier Division. four years later, in the 2018 season, PSIR had to be relegated to Liga 3 which is the lowest caste in Indonesian football competition. However, in the 2019 season, they were absent in Liga 3.

History

Establishment
PSIR Rembang was founded in 1950 based on the ideas of the players and administrators of local Rembang clubs that existed at that time. These clubs include PS MAESA Tawang Sari Rembang, PS Cahaya Muda Pandean and PS Garuda Sumberjo Rembang.

Thanks to this idea, in 1970 the PSIR Rembang club was founded, which became the representative of Rembang Regency.

However, until 1975 PSIR Rembang's achievements only reached the national level.

2008 Incident
On 12 November 2008 in their match away to Persibom at Ambang Stadium, Kotamobagu, PSIR players attacked and injured the referee, and later also the replacement referee. The match ended in 1-0 victory for Persibom. PSIR were suspended for two years following the attacks, but on appeal on 1 December 2008 the suspension was lifted, and their next match was rescheduled. The day after the incident PSIR players Yongki Rantung, Tadis Suryanto and Stevie Kusoi were banned from football for life. Five days later Stanley Mamuaya was also banned from football for life, while other players Stanley Katuuk, Gery Mandagi, and M Orah were banned for two years.

The incident occurred when referee Muzair Usman awarded a penalty for Persibom. Angered by the decision, PSIR players punched and kicked the referee until he went down. Not satisfied, the players trampled him, to the point where he had to be rushed to hospital with bruises. After the referee was replaced by reserve referee Jusman R.A, a similar incident almost happened. Jusman was chased and stripped naked in the field after showing a red card to a PSIR player who had made a bad challenge. Muzair Usman, Jusman R.A and match inspector Sukarno Wahid were eventually rewarded by the PSSI, as they were considered to have promoted football's image in Indonesia with their justice, bravery and loyalty.

Nicknames

PSIR is nicknamed Dampo Awang Army because there is an anchor property Dampo Awang in Rembang. PSIR is also nicknamed Deer because kijang is the fauna of the identity Rembang Regency.

Crest

Past Seasons
 2005: Position 5th Division III
 2005: Champions Division III(Promotion to Division II)
 2006: Champions Division II (Promotion to Division I)
 2007: Position 6rd Group II Division I
 2008: Champion Group II Division I (Promotion to Premier Division)
 2009: Position 9th Premier Division
 2010: Position 11th Premier Division
 2011: Position 11th Premier Division
 2012: Position 6th Premier Division (Promotion to Indonesian Premier League)
 2013: Position 16th Indonesian Premier League

Honours
Liga Indonesia Third Division
 Champions: 2005
Liga Indonesia Second Division
 Champions: 2006

Rivalries
PSIR Rembang have a very tough competitor in the League of Persiku Kudus. Since the beginning of the meeting of the league, this game usually called Muria derby.  This game is also often called the Muria Derby. PSIR Rembang still dominating victory and become the ruler of football in Muria area.

Supporters
PSIR Rembang has a fanbase called "The DampS (The Dampo Awang Supporters)", "GANSTER (Gabungan Supporter Rembang)", and  "REDAM (Rembang Dampo Awang Mania)".

References

External links
Unofficial site

Fans site
 

 
Football clubs in Indonesia
1950 establishments in Indonesia
Association football clubs established in 1950
Football clubs in Central Java